Sergei Grigoryevich Gorbunov (born 5 April 1987) is a former Russian professional football player.

Club career
He played in the Russian Football National League for FC Sportakademklub Moscow and FC Mashuk-KMV Pyatigorsk in 2008.

External links
 
 

1987 births
Sportspeople from Bryansk
Living people
Russian footballers
Association football defenders
FC Lokomotiv Moscow players
FC Zenit Saint Petersburg players
FC Neftekhimik Nizhnekamsk players
JK Sillamäe Kalev players
FC Dynamo Bryansk players
FC Dynamo Saint Petersburg players
Meistriliiga players
Russian expatriate footballers
Expatriate footballers in Estonia
FC Sportakademklub Moscow players
FC Mashuk-KMV Pyatigorsk players
Russian expatriate sportspeople in Estonia